Seriocarpa is a genus of ascidian tunicates in the family Styelidae.

Species within the genus Seriocarpa include:
 Seriocarpa benthedi Monniot & Monniot, 1985 
 Seriocarpa cristata Millar, 1975 
 Seriocarpa littoralis Millar, 1975 
 Seriocarpa rhizoides Dielh, 1969 
 Seriocarpa tongae Monniot & Monniot, 2001

References

Stolidobranchia
Tunicate genera